The 1995–96 League of Wales was the fourth season of the League of Wales since its establishment in 1992. The league was won by Barry Town.

League table

Results

References

Cymru Premier seasons
1995–96 in Welsh football leagues
Wales